Harry Carey may refer to:
Harry Carey (actor) (1878–1947), American actor 
Harry Carey Jr. (1921–2012), American actor
Harry Carey (footballer) (1916–1991), Australian rules footballer

See also 
Henry Carey (disambiguation)
Harry Caray (disambiguation) 
Harikari, English corruption of term Harakiri